Kawituyuq (Quechua kawitu camp bed; rocking chair; swing; barbecue, -yuq a suffix to indicate ownership, possibly "the one with a camp bed", also spelled Cahuituyoc) is a mountain in the Cordillera Central in the Andes of Peru which reaches a height of approximately . It is located in the Junín Region, Concepción Province, Quero District.

References 

Mountains of Peru
Mountains of Junín Region